Star Wars: The Emperor's New Clones (often abbreviated to TENCLO) is a 2006 feature-length Star Wars fan film that spoofs the story of Revenge of the Sith. It was created by Backyard Productions UK, a British amateur film production company founded by Darren Scales, Mark Scales and Edwin Hollingsbee. The film was premiered at Whittle Hall, RAF Cranwell on 9 September 2006.

Production
According to BBC News, filming was carried out in a garage studio. However, Camera Diaries claimed filming took place at RAF Waddington, and only the post-production was done in the garage studio.

Availability
The full film is available to download on TheForce.net. The complete DVD is available as a BitTorrent download.

Other Backyard Productions projects
The group have previously released several films: Geriatric Park (a parody of Jurassic Park, completed in 1994), Batman Returns Forever (a parody of Batman Returns and Batman Forever, completed in 1995), Star Wars: The Empire Strikes Backyard (a parody alternative to Star Wars: Episode II – Attack of the Clones inspired by the release of Star Wars: Episode I – The Phantom Menace and completed in 2000),  and Doom Raiders (a parody of Indiana Jones and Tomb Raider, filmed in Cyprus and completed in 2002).

Notes
 The name is a pun on the Hans Christian Andersen story, "The Emperor's New Clothes".

External links
 Backyard Productions Official Site
 Star Wars: The Emperor’s New Clones at TheForce.Net

References

2006 films
2006 independent films
Fan films based on Star Wars
2000s parody films
British space adventure films
Parody films based on Star Wars
2000s adventure films
2006 comedy films
2000s English-language films
2000s American films
2000s British films